S-Methyl thioacetate is a natural product found in many plant species. In its pure form it has an unpleasant sulfurous smell, but when highly diluted and along with other simple alkyl thioacetates and related compounds, it is an important component of the smell and flavour profile of some foods, especially Camembert cheese.

Alternate isomer

The constitutional isomer in which the oxygen and sulfur atoms are interchanged, O-methyl ethanethioate, is also commonly known as methyl thioacetate and found as a natural product and flavour component in some foods, such as fish sauce and some kinds of melon.

See also 
 Thioacetic acid

References 

Organosulfur compounds
Foul-smelling chemicals